The Dead On Tools 200 is a NASCAR Camping World Truck Series race held at Darlington Raceway.

John Hunter Nemechek is the defending winner of this race, having won it in 2022.

History

First ran in 2001, it was taken off the schedule after the 2004 season. In 2009, they announced after a six-year hiatus, Darlington would return to the Truck Series in August 2010. At the end of the year, they moved the race from August to mid-March for 2011. The race had been held under the lights since 2004. On November 21, 2011, it was announced that the event would once again be removed from the schedule.

The race returned to the Truck Series schedule in 2020 on Labor Day weekend initially as a one-off replacement date for the Chevrolet Silverado 250 at Canadian Tire Motorsport Park, which was canceled due to the COVID-19 pandemic. It also became part of "throwback weekend" with the Cup and Xfinity Series, which already had races at Darlington that weekend. It became a permanent date on the 2021 schedule and was pushed to the throwback weekend, now in May. The Truck Series race would continue to race with the Cup and Xfinity Series there as part of a new second race weekend for those two series there. Another temporary race called the In It To Win It 200 was added for September when the pandemic forced the Canadian Tire Motorsport Park race to be called off again.

The South Carolina Education Lottery sponsored the race in 2020. When it was retained on the 2021 schedule, The 4Less Group took over as title sponsor with its LiftKits4Less.com brand. The State of South Carolina took over naming rights for the temporary 2021 race and the South Carolina Education Lottery returned as the race's associate sponsor after being the title sponsor in 2020. The name of the race was the In It To Win It 200 (presented by the South Carolina Education Lottery) as the state government partnered with the track to give away prizes to those who received a COVID-19 vaccine at the track on the day of the race. Dead On Tools became the title sponsor of the track's one race in 2022.

Past winners

2001: Race shortened due to rain.
2004 & 2022: Races extended due to a green–white–checker finish.
2021 2: Race Add Due to Covid 19 Pandemic Replaced Race at Canadian Tire Motorsport Park.

Multiple winners (drivers)

Multiple winners (teams)

Manufacturer wins

References

External links
 

NASCAR Truck Series races
Recurring sporting events established in 2001
Recurring sporting events established in 2020
 
Annual sporting events in the United States